The fourth Howard ministry (Liberal–National coalition) was the 63rd ministry of the Government of Australia. It was led by the country's 25th prime minister, John Howard. The fourth Howard ministry succeeded the third Howard ministry, which dissolved on 26 October 2004 following the federal election that took place on 9 October. The ministry was replaced by the first Rudd ministry on 3 December 2007 following the federal election that took place on 24 November which saw Labor defeat the Coalition.

Cabinet

Outer ministry

Parliamentary Secretaries

See also
 First Howard ministry
 Second Howard ministry
 Third Howard ministry

Notes

Ministries of Elizabeth II
Howard, 4
2000s in Australia
2004 establishments in Australia
2007 disestablishments in Australia
Cabinets established in 2004
Cabinets disestablished in 2007
Howard Government